The 1956 Clemson Tigers football team was an American football team that represented Clemson College in the Atlantic Coast Conference (ACC) during the 1956 NCAA University Division football season. In its 17th season under head coach Frank Howard, the team compiled a 7–2–2 record (4–0–1 against conference opponents), won the ACC championship, was ranked No. 19 in the final AP Poll, lost to Colorado in the 1957 Orange Bowl, and outscored all opponents by a total of 167 to 101. The team played its home games at Memorial Stadium in Clemson, South Carolina.

Quarterback Charlie Bussey was the team captain. The team's statistical leaders included Bussey with 330 passing yards and left halfback Joel Wells with 803 rushing yards and 48 points (8 touchdowns).

Four Clemson players were selected by the Associated Press or the United Press to the first or second teams of the 1956 All-Atlantic Coast Conference football team: Joel Wells (AP-1, UP-1); Charlie Bussey (AP-1, UP-2); guard John Grdijan (AP-2, UP-1); and tackle Dick Maraza (AP-2). Four Clemson players were also named to the 1956 All-South Carolina football team: Joel Wells, guards John Grdijan and Earle Greene, and tackle Billy Hudson.

Schedule

After the season

The 1957 NFL Draft was held on November 26, 1956. The following Tigers were selected.

References

Clemson
Clemson Tigers football seasons
Atlantic Coast Conference football champion seasons
Clemson Tigers football